Ivan Nikolaevich Kramskoi (June 8 (O.S. May 27), 1837, Ostrogozhsk – April 6 (O.S. March 24), 1887, Saint Petersburg) was a Russian painter and art critic. He was an intellectual leader of the art movement known as the Wanderers between 1860–1880.

Life

Kramskoi came from an impoverished petit-bourgeois family. From 1857 to 1863 he studied at the St. Petersburg Academy of Arts; he reacted against academic art and was an initiator of the "Revolt of the Fourteen" which ended with the expulsion from the Academy of a group of its graduates, who organized the Artel of Artists ("").

Influenced by the ideas of the Russian revolutionary democrats, Kramskoi asserted the high public duty of the artist, principles of realism, and the moral substance and nationality of art. He became one of the main founders and ideologists of the Company of Itinerant Art Exhibitions (or Peredvizhniki). In 1863–1868 he taught at the drawing school of a society for the promotion of applied arts. He created a gallery of portraits of important Russian writers, scientists, artists and public figures (Lev Nikolaevich Tolstoy, 1873, Ivan Shishkin, 1873, Pavel Mikhailovich Tretyakov, 1876, Mikhail Saltykov-Shchedrin, 1879, Sergei Botkin, 1880) in which expressive simplicity of composition and clarity of depiction emphasize profound psychological elements of character. Kramskoi's democratic ideals found their brightest expression in his portraits of peasants, which portrayed a wealth of character-details in representatives of the common people.

In one of Kramskoi's most well known paintings, Christ in the Desert (1872, Tretyakov gallery), he continued Alexander Ivanov's humanistic tradition by treating a religious subject in moral–philosophical terms. He imbued his image of Christ with dramatic experiences in a deeply psychological and vital interpretation, evoking the idea of his heroic self-sacrifice.

Aspiring to expand the ideological expressiveness of his images, Kramskoi created art that existed on the cusp of portraiture and genre-painting ("Nekrasov during the period of 'Last songs,'" 1877–78; "Unknown Woman," 1883; "Inconsolable grief," 1884; all in Tretyakov gallery). These paintings disclose their subjects' complex and sincere emotions, their personalities and fates. The orientation of Kramskoi's art, his acute critical judgments about it, and his persistent quest for objective public criteria for the evaluation of art exerted an essential influence on the development of realist art and aesthetics in Russia in the last third of the nineteenth century.

Kramskoi was considered an eccentric for giving his works to customers in expensive frames and not charging money for it. He died from an aortic aneurism while working at his easel, aged only forty-nine.

Gallery

References

External links

 Ivan Kramskoi's gallery and biography
 Ivan Kramskoi Gallery at MuseumSyndicate 

1837 births
1887 deaths
People from Ostrogozhsky District
People from Ostrogozhsky Uyezd
Russian people of Ukrainian descent
Peredvizhniki
Russian male painters
Orientalist painters
19th-century painters from the Russian Empire
Imperial Academy of Arts alumni
Burials at Tikhvin Cemetery
19th-century male artists from the Russian Empire